John Valance Sands (April 17, 1933 – December 31, 2020) was a Canadian speed skater who competed at the 1956 Winter Olympics and 1960 Winter Olympics. He was born in Saskatoon, Saskatchewan, and also briefly played Canadian football with the Saskatoon Hilltops in the 1950s. He is a member of the Saskatchewan Sports Hall of Fame and the Saskatoon Sports Hall of Fame.

By 1962, Sands had become a coaching staff manager in Mount Royal, Quebec, working alongside Leopold Sylvestre. He died of pancreatic cancer on December 31, 2020.

References

External links
 

Olympic speed skaters of Canada
Speed skaters at the 1956 Winter Olympics
Speed skaters at the 1960 Winter Olympics
Sportspeople from Saskatoon
Players of Canadian football from Saskatchewan
Canadian male speed skaters
1933 births
2020 deaths
20th-century Canadian people